In Japanese,  refers to a region disputed between Russia and Japan, currently under Russian administration. Under Japanese classification, it belongs to Nemuro Subprefecture, Hokkaidō, Japan. Cape Kamuiwakka (Russian: Cape Koritskiy) is the northernmost point under Japanese claim.

History
It was established in 1869 as part of Chishima Province when 11 provinces and 86 districts were established in Hokkaidō. The district initially consisted of Shibetoro (蘂取村) and Otoimaushi (乙今牛村) villages. In 1923, the two villages merged to become just  Shibetoro (Rudnaya) village. In August 1945, it was invaded by the Soviet army. The region remains under control of the Russian Federation.

See also
 Kuril Islands dispute
 Extreme points of Japan

Districts in Hokkaido